Taft Southwest is a census-designated place (CDP) in San Patricio County, Texas, United States. The population was 1,460 at the 2010 census.

Geography
Taft Southwest is located at  (27.970392, -97.403156).

According to the United States Census Bureau, the CDP has a total area of 0.6 square mile (1.6 km2), all land.

Demographics
As of the census of 2000, there were 1,721 people, 477 households, and 392 families residing in the CDP. The population density was 2,845.2 people per square mile (1,107.5/km2). There were 532 housing units at an average density of 879.5/sq mi (342.3/km2). The racial makeup of the CDP was 69.26% White, 0.06% African American, 0.17% Native American, 0.17% Pacific Islander, 26.73% from other races, and 3.60% from two or more races. Hispanic or Latino of any race were 97.09% of the population.

There were 477 households, out of which 38.6% had children under the age of 18 living with them, 56.4% were married couples living together, 19.5% had a female householder with no husband present, and 17.8% were non-families. 16.1% of all households were made up of individuals, and 9.2% had someone living alone who was 65 years of age or older. The average household size was 3.61 and the average family size was 4.08.

In the CDP the population was spread out, with 33.5% under the age of 18, 10.8% from 18 to 24, 23.9% from 25 to 44, 19.7% from 45 to 64, and 12.1% who were 65 years of age or older. The median age was 30 years. For every 100 females, there were 102.2 males. For every 100 females age 18 and over, there were 95.1 males.

The median income for a household in the CDP was $22,179, and the median income for a family was $24,250. Males had a median income of $22,279 versus $12,143 for females. The per capita income for the CDP was $8,813. About 30.5% of families and 34.3% of the population were below the poverty line, including 40.7% of those under age 18 and 39.5% of those age 65 or over.

Education
Taft Southwest is served by the Taft Independent School District.

References

Census-designated places in San Patricio County, Texas
Geography of San Patricio County, Texas
Corpus Christi metropolitan area